Alloclemensia unifasciata is a moth of the family Incurvariidae. It is found in Japan on the islands of Hokkaido, Honshu and Kyushu.

The wingspan is 7.5–9.5 mm for males and 8–10 mm for females. The forewings are dark brown with a purple tinge.

The larvae feed on Viburnum species, including Viburnum dilatatum and Viburnum furcatum. They create an irregular case of several layers of leaf epidermis.

References

Moths described in 1981
Incurvariidae
Moths of Japan